Keith Andre Edmonson (born September 28, 1960) is an American former professional basketball player. He was born in Gulfport, Mississippi.

College career
Edmonson was a part of the Purdue Boilermakers team that reached the 1980 NCAA Final Four. He averaged 21.3 points per game in his senior year.

Professional career
Edmonson was selected 10th overall in the 1982 NBA Draft, by the Atlanta Hawks. He averaged 6 points per game in an 87-game NBA career, playing with the Hawks, the San Antonio Spurs, and the Denver Nuggets.

External links
 

1960 births
Living people
American expatriate basketball people in France
American men's basketball players
Atlanta Hawks draft picks
Atlanta Hawks players
Basketball players from Mississippi
Denver Nuggets players
Louisville Catbirds players
Purdue Boilermakers men's basketball players
San Antonio Spurs players
Shooting guards
Sportspeople from Gulfport, Mississippi